Denzel (a derivative of Denzil) may refer to:

People with the given name "Denzel" include
Gabriel Denzel galit ako
Denzel Bentley (born 1995), English boxer
Denzel Bowles (born 1989), American basketball player
Denzel Budde (born 1997), Dutch footballer
Denzel Comenentia (born 1995), Dutch athlete
Denzel Curry (born 1995), American rapper
Denzel De Roeve (born 2004), Belgian footballer
Denzel Devall (born 1994), American football player
Denzel Dumfries (born 1996), Dutch footballer
Denzelle Good (born 1991), American football player
Denzel Hall (born 2001), Dutch footballer
Denzel Jubitana (born 1999), Belgian footballer
Denzel Livingston (born 1993), American basketball player
Denzel Mahoney (born 1998), American basketball player
Denzel Mims (born 1997), American football player
Denzel Nkemdiche (born 1993), American football player
Denzel Perryman (born 1992), American football player
Denzel Prempeh (born 1984), Ghanaian musician
Denzel Radford (born 1994), Canadian football player
Denzel Ramirez (born 1983), Trinidadian runner
Denzel Rice (born 1993), American football player
Denzel Slager (born 1993), Dutch footballer
Denzel Valentine (born 1993), American basketball player
Denzel Ward (born 1997), American football player
Denzel Washington (born 1954), American actor
Denzel Whitaker (born 1990), American actor

People with the surname "Denzel" include
John Denzel (??–1535), English landowner
Peter Denzel (born 1939), Austrian sailor
Yomi Denzel (born 1996), Swiss-Nigerian entrepreneur

Other uses
Denzel (automobile), an Austrian automobile manufactured in the 1940s and 1950s
Mr. Denzel Crocker, a fictional character in The Fairly OddParents

See also
Danzel (born 1976), Belgian dance musician
Denzil (disambiguation)

English masculine given names
German given names
German-language surnames